Semyon Valuysky (born February 10, 1991) is a Russian professional ice hockey forward who currently plays for HC Yugra of the Supreme Hockey League (VHL). He has formerly played for Torpedo Nizhny Novgorod, Metallurg Novokuznetsk, Lada Togliatti and Admiral Vladivostok.

References

External links

1991 births
Living people
Admiral Vladivostok players
HC Lada Togliatti players
Metallurg Novokuznetsk players
Sportspeople from Tolyatti
Russian ice hockey left wingers
Torpedo Nizhny Novgorod players
HC Yugra players